Wesleyan Christian Academy is a private Christian school in West Bay, Grand Cayman, Cayman Islands. It serves grade levels K4-12.  there are 130 students. The school was established in 1977.

References

External links
 Wesleyan Christian Academy

Schools in Grand Cayman
Educational institutions established in 1977
1977 establishments in the Cayman Islands